The Maranoa River, part of the Murray-Darling basin, is a river situated in South West Queensland, Australia.

Course and features
Formed by the confluence of the west and east branches of the river, the Maranoa River rises on the Consuelo Tableland in the Carnarvon National Park. The valleys in the river's catchment area are broad rather than gorge-like as in the nearby Carnarvon Gorge, with isolated bluffs and pillars of sandstone on sandy plains. The Maranoa passes through Mitchell and flows south towards St George. The Balonne eventually flows into the Darling River (via a few branches), so it contributes to the Murray-Darling Basin. From source to mouth, the Maranoa is joined by 31 tributaries including the Merivale River and descends  over its  course.

The Warrego Highway crosses the river at Mitchell.

The Neil Turner Weir was built on the river in 1984. It provides limited supplies for irrigation purposes. It also regulates streamflow and has recreational uses.

Major flooding on the river occurred in 1990.

Popular culture
A number of Australian folksongs (such as Sandy Maranoa and The Maranoa Drovers) refer to this river.

See also

References

Rivers of Queensland
South West Queensland
Tributaries of the Darling River